The 2018 Georgian protests were series of mass protests in Tbilisi that turned into anti-government demonstrations starting on 12 May, when police raided the nightclubs Bassiani and Gallery. Protesters gained momentum when thousands gathered in front of the Parliament building, where organizers called for the drug policy reform. The protests illustrated increasing divide in the society around the topics of culture war, especially among the youth. The protests were met by various counter-protests and rallies. On May 13 the fascist organization Georgian National Unity rallied against the ″drug dealers and LGBT propagandists″, as its leader, Giorgi Chelidze has stated. Various conservative organizations headed by Georgian March and Georgian Idea also organized counter-protests against the drug liberalization, gathering thousands of people in front of the Parliament building. As the protests became more politicized, thousands demanded the resignation of prime minister Giorgi Kvirikashvili.

The Minister of Internal Affairs Giorgi Gakharia has stated that the raid in nightclubs on May 12 came after 48 cases of drug intoxication of clubbers over the past two weeks. According to his statement, the ministry has been monitoring the nightclubs and detected various cases of illegal drug trade. The aim of the special operation was to uncover links between the drug dealers and the nightclub infrastructure. The minister showed up in front of protesters on May 13 and apologized if any law enforcer abused his power. He met the organizers of the protests and agreed to create two working groups. One group would work on the draft of a drug policy and another on the police raid and whether the individual law enforcers exceeded their powers or not. The actions of the minister caused negative reaction among the conservative public.

On 31 May another wave of demonstrations started in the streets of Tbilisi to protest a perceived miscarriage of justice following the killing of two 15 years old teenagers in a street knife-combat in December. The protests continued sporadically until June 11, when the police dismantled camps erected by the protesters in front of the parliament building in Tbilisi. Georgia's chief prosecutor Irakli Shotadze resigned over the case, while the government established a special parliamentary fact-finding commission chaired by an opposition politician.

On 13 June 2018 Prime Minister Giorgi Kvirikashvili resigned following the May protests.

See also
 White Noise Movement
 Cannabis in Georgia (country)
 2021 Tbilisi Pride protests

References

2018 protests
Protests in Georgia (country)
2018 in Georgia (country)